Elise Mertens and Aryna Sabalenka were the defending champions, but lost in the quarterfinals to Laura Siegemund and Vera Zvonareva.

Siegemund and Zvonareva went on to win the title in their first event together, beating Nicole Melichar and Xu Yifan in the final, 6–4, 6–4. This was the first time since 2006 that an unseeded team won the US Open women's doubles titles; incidentally, Zvonareva was part of this unseeded team. This was Zvonareva's third Grand Slam title in women's doubles, fifth Grand Slam title overall, her first Grand Slam title since the 2012 Australian Open women's doubles, and her first U.S. Open title since the aforementioned title in 2006. It was Siegemund's first Grand Slam women's doubles title, and her second Grand Slam title overall.

Seeds

Draw

Finals

Top half

Bottom half

Other entry information

Wild cards

Protected ranking

References

External links
Main draw

Women's Doubles
US Open - Women's Doubles
US Open (tennis) by year – Women's doubles